Katrina Williams is an American jazz and blues singer currently living in Asheville, North Carolina. She was a finalist on America's Got Talent, where she made it through to the Las Vegas rounds. Williams also appeared on The Tonight Show with Jay Leno.

Community outreach
Kat Williams is program director for the Buncombe County Sheriff's Department. She became involved in the Boys and Girls Club of Henderson County in 2015 and joined its board of directors. In 2018 she performed as part of "A Special Evening with Elizabeth Smart: Where's There Hope, There's Healing," an effort to address sexual violence.

Personal life
Williams is in a same-sex partnership with Patrice Boudreaux and the two live in Asheville, North Carolina.

Medical issues
In 2015 Williams began having health issue that would later be diagnosed as End Stage Renal Disease (stage 5), better known as kidney failure. Williams is also diabetic. She was placed on the kidney donor list by Emory Hospital in Atlanta and received a kidney transplant.

Awards
In 2012 Williams received an Emmy Award nomination for her work on the Hands of Hope project which featured several famous vocalists. The project was headed out by recording artist and producer, David L Cook. She received the 2012 AMG Heritage Award for Female Vocalist of the Year. She won a collaborative AMG Heritage Award for her work on the video for Hands of Hope.

References

America's Got Talent contestants
American women singers
Place of birth missing (living people)
American blues singers
Living people
Musicians from Asheville, North Carolina
Year of birth missing (living people)
21st-century American women